Command Performances: The Essential 60s Masters II is a two-disc compilation of studio master recordings by American singer and musician Elvis Presley during the decade of the 1960s, released in 1995 on RCA Records, catalogue number 66601-2. It also includes a booklet with session details and an essay by Susan M. Doll.

Contents
The set comprises a selection of recordings made by Presley during the decade specifically at a session for the soundtrack of a feature film, of which Presley made 27 during the 1960s. Excluded are all other studio recordings from the decade, as well as those for his 1968 television special and the 1969 live recordings. These soundtrack songs, of which 211 were released in Presley's lifetime, originally appeared in a variety of formats: on 15 full-length long-playing albums, five EPs, and numerous singles. Of the 211, 23 were released on later compilations, both standard and budget, while two tracks were used to bring up the running times respectively of Something for Everybody and Pot Luck. All of Elvis' 1960s movies are represented by at least one song in this set with the exception of Tickle Me, its EP soundtrack consisting of five previously issued studio recordings, all of which were included on the box set first volume of the Essential '60s Masters.

The two discs present the studio masters in rough chronological session order. Two previously unreleased masters appear: a version of the Eddy Arnold song "You Don't Know Me" recorded during the sessions for the movie Clambake; and an alternate take of the song "Follow That Dream" as the stereo master for the original has been lost, and the compilers opted not to use the surviving mono master. The songs "Can't Help Falling in Love" and "Rock-A-Hula Baby" were released as, respectively, the A-side and b-side of a single following the release of the Blue Hawaii album, and went to #2 and #23 on the Billboard Pop Singles chart. "Puppet on a String" appeared as a single seven months after the release of the Girl Happy soundtrack, backed with "Wooden Heart" from G.I. Blues, and peaked at #14 on the singles chart. "Wooden Heart" had also been released as the flipside to a reissue of "Blue Christmas" eleven months earlier.

RCA issued a box set for the complete non-gospel songs that were not recorded at soundtrack sessions during the decade, From Nashville to Memphis: The Essential 60s Masters, and released a similar two-disc set for the gospel recordings in 1994, Amazing Grace: His Greatest Sacred Performances.

Purpose
Generally, Presley's 1960s soundtrack recordings command the least regard among the singer's recorded work. The most successful commercially, such as G.I. Blues and Blue Hawaii, fell in the tradition of the film musical as it had developed through the 1950s, that of the integrated musical where the songs are integral to the story line. Hence, songs such as "Fort Lauderdale Chamber of Commerce" from Girl Happy or "There's No Room to Rhumba in A Sports Car" from Fun in Acapulco made no sense outside of their movies and hardly found a place in Presley's stage act, or could ever be considered classics along the lines of "Jailhouse Rock" or "Love Me Tender", whose films were not integrated musicals. As stated by Susan Doll in the liner notes, the songs from the soundtracks are often judged by inappropriate criteria:
...this type of (integrated) musical was standard fare in Hollywood for decades. However, those who criticize Elvis' musical vehicles generally overlook this, preferring to attack the songs as being inferior to his non-movie output...
This package, collecting 62 of the songs released on record in association with the films, selects in many cases those numbers that can stand outside of their film vehicles, concentrating on title tracks and songs that had been also released as singles immediately prior to the release of the soundtrack.

All selections recorded at Radio Recorders, Western Recorders, Paramount Recording Stage, MGM Studios, Samuel Goldwyn Studio, United Artist Recorders, Decca Universal Studio, and RCA Studios in Hollywood, RCA Studio B in Nashville, Tennessee. Original recordings produced by Joseph Lilley, Urban Thielmann, Hans Salter, Jeff Alexander, George Stoll, Gene Nelson, Fred Karger, Felton Jarvis, Billy Strange, Hugo Montenegro, Billy Goldenberg, and Leith Stevens. Discographical information below taken from Elvis Presley A Life in Music: The Complete Recording Sessions, by Ernst Jorgensen, St. Martin's Press, New York, 1998.

Track listing
Chart positions for LPs from Billboard Top Pop Albums chart; positions for singles and EPs from Billboard Pop Singles chart. By late 1968, Billboard discontinued charting B-sides. Titles listed without corresponding LP/EP designation were initially released as singles only.

Disc one

Disc two

Personnel

 Elvis Presley – vocals, guitar
 Scotty Moore – guitar
 Tiny Timbrell – guitar
 Howard Roberts – guitar
 Hank Garland – guitar
 Barney Kessell – guitar
 Billy Strange – guitar
 Tommy Tedesco – guitar
 Chip Young – guitar
 Neal Matthews – guitar
 Harold Bradley – guitar
 Joseph Gibbons – guitar
 Neil Levang – guitar
 Charles Britz – guitar
 Alvin Casey – guitar
 Dennis Budimir – guitar
 Mike Deasy – guitar
 Jerry Kennedy – guitar
 Charlie McCoy – guitar, harmonica
 Alvino Rey – steel guitar
 Bernal Lewis – steel guitar
 Fred Tavares – ukulele
 Bernie Lewis – ukulele
 Cecil Brower – fiddle
 Gordon Terry – fiddle
 Floyd Cramer – piano
 Dudley Brooks – piano, organ
 Don Robertson – piano, organ
 Calvin Jackson – piano
 Larry Muhoberac – piano
 Don Randi – piano
 Hoyt Hawkins – tambourine
 Bob Moore – bass
 Ray Siegel – bass
 Meyer Rubin – bass
 Henry Strzelecki – bass
 Larry Knechtel – bass
 Charles Berghofer – bass
 Max Bennett – bass
 Lyle Ritz – bass
 D.J. Fontana – drums
 Buddy Harman – drums
 Frank Bode (aka Uffe Baadh) – drums
 Bernie Mattinson – drums
 Hal Blaine – drums
 Frank Carlson – drums
 Kenny Buttrey – drums
 Carl O'Brian – drums
 John Guerin – drums
 Milt Holland – percussion
 Victor Feldman – percussion
 Emil Radocchia – percussion
 Gene Nelson – congas
 Jimmie Haskell – accordion
 Boots Randolph – saxophone, clarinet
 Clifford Scott – saxophone
 William Green – saxophone
 Steve Douglas – saxophone
 Bill Justis – saxophone
 Tony Terran – trumpet
 Rudolph Loera – trumpet
 James Zito – trumpet
 Herb Taylor -trombone
 Randall Miller – trombone
 Rufus Long – flute
 Ralph Stobel – oboe
 George Fields – harmonica
 The Jordanaires – backing vocals
 The Surfers – backing vocals
 The Mello Men – backing vocals
 The Amigos – backing vocals
 The Jubilee Four – backing vocals
 The Carole Lombard Trio – backing vocals
 Millie Kirkham – backing vocals
 Dolores Edgin – backing vocals

References

Elvis Presley compilation albums
1995 compilation albums
Soundtrack compilation albums
RCA Records compilation albums
Compilation albums published posthumously